Bad Impulse is a 2020 American horror film directed by Michelle Danner and starring Grant Bowler, Sonya Walger, James Landry Hebert, Dan Lauria and Paul Sorvino.

Cast
Grant Bowler as Henry Sharpe
Sonya Walger as Christine Sharpe
David Coussins as Liam
Paul Sorvino as Lou Branch
James Landry Hebert as The Stranger
Stephanie Cayo as Lucia
Dan Lauria as Brandon Reilly
Rebecca Black as Joy

Release
The film premiered at the TCL Chinese Theatre as part of the Golden State Film Festival on February 29, 2020.  Gravitas Ventures then acquired distribution rights to the film in November 2020.  The film was then released in select theaters and on VOD on December 18, 2020.

Reception
Josiah Teal of Film Threat gave the film a 7 out of 10.

References

External links
 
 

American horror films
2020 horror films
2020s English-language films
2020s American films
English-language horror films